William James Thorne CBE (4 October 1857 – 2 January 1946) was a British trade unionist, activist and one of the first Labour Members of Parliament.

Early years

Thorne was born in Hockley, Birmingham, on 8 October 1857. His father and other relatives worked as brickmakers. Thorne's father died in a fight when Thorne was just seven years old. Thorne began working at the age of six, turning a wheel for a rope and twine spinner, working from six in the morning to six at night, with half an hour's break for breakfast and an hour for dinner. Thorne recalls that when the spinner wanted to reduce his wages from 2 shillings and 6 pence to 2 shillings, he "went on strike" and never returned to the job.

The family was on poor relief. Thorne's mother and three sisters worked all hours sewing hooks and eyes. "It was here I had intimate experience with sweated labour", he commented without irony. Thorne took a job with his uncle at a brick and tile works, and later, at another brickworks further away. At the age of nine, Thorne recalled: "my mother got me up at four o'clock every morning to give me my breakfast". It was a five-mile walk to work.

Political career

Thorne served for many years on West Ham Borough Council and was Mayor from 1917–18.

In 1882, Thorne moved to London and found employment at a gasworks. Thorne joined the Social Democratic Federation (SDF) and became branch secretary. Barely literate, Thorne improved his reading skills with the assistance of Karl Marx's daughter, Eleanor Marx.

In 1889, he helped to found the National Union of Gas Workers and General Labourers, one of the prominent New Unions and became its general secretary. He retained this position in the union and its successors, which became the GMWU in 1924, up to 1934. Thorne also helped to organise the London Dock Strike in 1889.

He contested several elections as a Labour candidate, before finally winning a seat representing West Ham South at the 1906 general election. He remained with SDF as it became the British Socialist Party. Thorne visited the Soviet Union shortly after the Russian Revolution of 1917.

He won the seat of Plaistow in 1918 with 94.9% of the vote, a record for a Labour candidate which stands to this day. He retained it until his retirement at the 1945 general election, aged 87 — the oldest sitting member at the time.

Awards / Commemorations
Thorne was appointed Commander of the Order of the British Empire (CBE) in 1930 and Privy Councillor in 1945.

A Greater London Council blue plaque, unveiled in 1987, commemorates Thorne at his home, 1 Lawrence Road, E13 0QD, in West Ham. In addition, the Will Thorne Pavilion in Beckton Park in Beckton is named for Thorne.

The GMB's regional office in Halesowen is named Will Thorne House after the former NUGWGL leader (the NUGWGL/GMWU being a founding component of the GMB in 1982).  The GMB's Thorne Credit Union is likewise named for Will Thorne.

Footnotes

External links 
 

1857 births
1946 deaths
British trade union leaders
General Secretaries of the GMB (trade union)
Labour Party (UK) MPs for English constituencies
British Socialist Party members
Commanders of the Order of the British Empire
Councillors in Greater London
GMB (trade union)-sponsored MPs
People from Birmingham, West Midlands
Social Democratic Federation members
UK MPs 1906–1910
UK MPs 1910
UK MPs 1910–1918
UK MPs 1918–1922
UK MPs 1922–1923
UK MPs 1923–1924
UK MPs 1924–1929
UK MPs 1929–1931
UK MPs 1931–1935
UK MPs 1935–1945
Presidents of the Trades Union Congress
Mayors of places in Greater London
Members of the Parliamentary Committee of the Trades Union Congress
Members of the Privy Council of the United Kingdom